WEGL 91.1 FM (91.1 FM) is a Class A, non-commercial, FM, College radio station located on the campus of Auburn University in Auburn, Alabama. The station's programming is broadcast at 1,800 watts from a tower situated on Auburn University's campus.

WEGL's broadcast listening area includes the Alabama counties of Lee, Chambers, Macon, Russell, Tallapoosa, and Muscogee County, Georgia. WEGL streams its broadcasts over the internet through its website.

The bulk of funding for the operation of WEGL 91 is allocated by Auburn University's Student Government Association and comes directly from Auburn's students' Student Activity Fees.

WEGL's all-volunteer DJ staff includes various members of the Auburn University student, faculty, and staff populations.

History 
WEGL was not the first radio station at Auburn University. In 1922, WMAV began broadcasting from Broun Hall with a 1,500-watt homemade transmitter. It became part of the University’s Extension Service and received a new name, WAPI (for the school’s name at the time: Alabama Polytechnic Institute.) WAPI was later moved to Birmingham, Alabama.

On June 1, 1970, the Board of Trustees authorized then-University President Harry Philpott to submit an application, on behalf of the Board of Trustees, to the Federal Communications Commission (FCC) for a permit to construct and operate an FM radio station. The Student Government Association then funded the operation of the station.
	
On April 25, 1971, WEGL Radio signed on the air with 10 watts of power and began broadcasting at 91.1 megahertz (MHz), as assigned by the FCC. The first song broadcast was  "Another Day" by Paul McCartney. The first WEGL studio was located in  room 1239 of Haley Center. After one year of operation, a student committee submitted a proposal to the Auburn University Board of Student Communication requesting a power increase. With the support of the University’s President, WEGL’s effective radiated power (ERP) increased to 380 watts in 1975. In June 1977, the station began broadcasting in stereo. The last song broadcast in mono was Elton John's Captain Fantastic and the first song broadcast in stereo was "You've Got A Cold" by 10CC.
	

In 1988, the station upgraded its power to 3,000 watts and became a Class A Non-Commercial radio station. During the 1989-1990 school year, plans were finalized to move WEGL Radio from its home in the Haley Center to a new location in Foy Student Union. On October 8, 1990, then university president James E. Martin officially signed WEGL on for the first time from the Foy Student Union.

WEGL remained in Foy Student Union until the summer of 2008. WEGL made its final broadcast from that location at 5:00 PM on Friday, August 15, 2008. The final song broadcast from Foy Student Union was "A Little Bit" by Tim Fite.

WEGL, along with all other campus media, relocated from Foy Student Union to the new Student Center during the first weeks of the fall 2008 semester. Broadcasting with live DJs and Internet streaming audio resumed shortly thereafter from the new location.

On April 25, 2009 WEGL, in association with the Committee of 19, held its first live music event in over a decade. "WEGLfest" was held in the ballroom of the New Student Center and all proceeds from the event went to benefit Auburn's War on Hunger. Performers at the event included Magnolia Sons, Weak Music for Thomas, and Tony Brook. The event took place on the 38th anniversary of WEGL's first air-date.

Programming
WEGL 91.1 is a traditional "college radio" station in that the station's programming consists of an eclectic mix of genres including, but not limited to: Rock, Hip-Hop, Pop, Blues, Jazz, Country and Bluegrass, Soul, Dance & Techno, R&B, Reggae, World Music, Oldies, and Gospel. In addition to music, WEGL also has a sports department. WEGL reports its charts to the College Music Journal.

References

External links

Comedy Clips & Promos recorded at WEGL

EGL
EGL
Radio stations established in 1971
Auburn University